Klaus Bonsack (26 December 1941 – 5 March 2023), also known as Klaus-Michael Bonsack, was an East German luger who competed during the 1960s and early 1970s.

Bonsack was born in Waltershausen, Thuringia on 26 December 1941. He won four Winter Olympic medals in men's luge with one gold (doubles: 1968), one silver (singles: 1964), and two bronzes (singles: 1968, doubles: 1972).

Bonsack also won five medals at the FIL World Luge Championships with one gold (doubles: 1967), two silvers (doubles: 1965, singles: 1967), and two bronzes (singles: 1963, doubles: 1969).

Bonsack later served as chairman of the track construction commission, approving the final homologation of Cesana Pariol prior to the 2006 Winter Olympics for luge to compete at the track. He was among the first three inductees in the International Luge Federation (FIL) Hall of Fame in 2004, along with Paul Hildgartner and Margit Schumann.

Bonsack later emigrated to Austria where he became a luge coach. One of his students, Doris Neuner, won gold in the women's singles event at the 1992 Winter Olympics in Albertville. 

Bonsack died in Innsbruck on 5 March 2023, at the age of 81.

References

Sources
 FIL approves track for use for the 2006 Winter Olympics, featuring Bonsack
 FIL-Luge.org January 7, 2004 Hall of Fame induction.
 Fuzilogik Sports – Winter Olympic results – Men's luge
 Hickok sports information on World champions in luge and skeleton.
 List of Great Olympians BO

1941 births
2023 deaths
People from Waltershausen
German male lugers
Sportspeople from Thuringia
German emigrants to Austria
Olympic lugers of the United Team of Germany
Olympic lugers of East Germany
Lugers at the 1964 Winter Olympics
Lugers at the 1968 Winter Olympics
Lugers at the 1972 Winter Olympics
Olympic silver medalists for the United Team of Germany
Olympic gold medalists for East Germany
Olympic bronze medalists for East Germany
Olympic medalists in luge
Medalists at the 1964 Winter Olympics
Medalists at the 1968 Winter Olympics
Medalists at the 1972 Winter Olympics
Recipients of the Patriotic Order of Merit in gold
Recipients of the Banner of Labor